Lake Evoron is a large freshwater lake in Khabarovsk Krai, Russia. It is located in the Gorin river basin, part of the Amur basin. 

It has an area of 194 square kilometres, and is 30 km long and 12 km wide. Its average depth is about 2–3 m. The lake is used for fishing. The Evur and Shroki rivers flow into the lake. The outflow is the Devyatke river, a tributary of the Gorin.

See also
List of lakes of Russia

References

Evoron